The first season of the American television series Agent Carter, which is inspired by the film Captain America: The First Avenger and the Marvel One-Shot short film of the same name, features the character Peggy Carter, based on the Marvel Comics character of the same name, as she must balance doing administrative work and going on secret missions for Howard Stark while trying to navigate life as a single woman in 1940s America. It is set in the Marvel Cinematic Universe (MCU), sharing continuity with the films of the franchise, and was produced by ABC Studios, Marvel Television, and F&B Fazekas & Butters. Tara Butters, Michele Fazekas, and Chris Dingess served as showrunners.

Hayley Atwell reprises her role from the film series and One-Shot as Carter, with James D'Arcy, Chad Michael Murray, Enver Gjokaj, and Shea Whigham also starring. In May 2014, ABC bypassed a pilot, ordering a show based on the One-Shot straight to series for an eight episode season. Filming took place in Los Angeles from September 2014 to January 2015, and Industrial Light & Magic provided visual effects. The season introduces the origins of several characters and storylines from MCU films, while other characters from the films and Marvel One-Shots also appear.

The season, which aired on ABC from January 6 to February 24, 2015, over 8 episodes, aired during the season two mid-season break of Marvel's Agents of S.H.I.E.L.D. Despite steadily dropping viewership, critical response to Agent Carter was positive, with much praise going to Atwell's performance, the series' tone and setting, and its relative separation from the rest of the MCU. The series was renewed for a second season on May 7, 2015.

Episodes

Cast and characters

Main
 Hayley Atwell as Peggy Carter
 James D'Arcy as Edwin Jarvis
 Chad Michael Murray as Jack Thompson
 Enver Gjokaj as Daniel Sousa
 Shea Whigham as Roger Dooley

Recurring
 Dominic Cooper as Howard Stark
 Lyndsy Fonseca as Angie Martinelli
 Kyle Bornheimer as Ray Krzeminski
 Meagen Fay as Miriam Fry
 Bridget Regan as Dottie Underwood
 Ralph Brown as Johann Fennhoff

Notable guests
 Costa Ronin as Anton Vanko
 Neal McDonough as Timothy "Dum Dum" Dugan
 Toby Jones as Arnim Zola

Production

Development
By September 2013, Marvel Television was developing a series inspired by the Agent Carter One-Shot short film, featuring the Marvel Comics character Peggy Carter. On May 8, 2014, ABC officially ordered the series, bypassing a pilot order, and later confirmed that Agent Carter would air between the 2014 finale and 2015 premiere of the second season of Agents of S.H.I.E.L.D., beginning January 6, 2015. Later in May, star Hayley Atwell stated that the season would consist of eight episodes. Executive producers for the season include Tara Butters, Michelle Fazekas, Christopher Markus, Stephen McFeely, Chris Dingess, Kevin Feige, Louis D'Esposito, Alan Fine, Joe Quesada, Stan Lee, and Jeph Loeb. Butters, Fazekas, and Dingess serve as showrunners on the season.

Writing
Markus & McFeely, writers on the Captain America films, had written a script for the first episode by January 2014. They stated in March that the series would be set in 1946, occurring in the middle of the timeline established in the One-Shot. In July, Butters and Fazekas revealed that writing for the rest of the season would begin in August 2014.

In July 2014, Fazekas stated that it was "fabulous from a writing perspective" to have an eight episode order, as "you can plan it and know where you're heading... They're all their own stories and they all have their own drive, but it's sort of building toward a big thing at the end of the eight episodes." Elaborating on this, Atwell said, "it's incredibly tight, the script, which is great. It's fast moving and fast paced but luckily because it's not stretched out of 22 episodes, nothing is diluted. Every line is vital to not only moving the story and the action [along] but also developing the characters." The season's overarching storyline revolves around the chemical weapon Midnight Oil, which is based on the Madbomb of the Captain America comics. The Madbomb was originally considered for use in Captain America: Civil War, before negotiations with actors to adapt the "Civil War" storyline were completed. Also in July, it was revealed that Carter's husband would be explored in the series. However, he was ultimately not explored much in the first season, with McFeely saying, "This was the season where she says goodbye to Steve [Rogers]... In a second season, she could be freer to have those conversations about a life after him."

Speaking about the season's use of 1940s terminology, Fazekas stated that terms like "broad" and "dame" were preferably avoided, while research was done to ensure terms that were used in the series were actually in use during that time, with Fazekas giving the example, "you know what didn't exist in 1946? Smart ass. I looked up the etymology on that, didn't exist in 1946. Turns out it was a term that came around in the 60s. But for instance, I wrote a line that said, "Oh I think someone's yanking your chain." And I had to look it up, did that exist in 1946? And actually it did; it's a mining term that exists from a long time ago. That's our research that we do." Research was also done on radio shows of the time to ensure realism when creating the fictional Captain America Adventure Program, with details discovered and replicated on the series including the use of lobsters and ham to create sound effects for the radio show. The Griffith Hotel, the all-women boarding house where Carter lives, is based on the real-life Barbizon Hotel for Women. Butters felt that while working in the time period, it became an issue to not sound "too period". Additionally, it was difficult to write British people from the time in order to avoid stereotypes such as the "typical British butler". However, D'Arcy, who is British, felt the writing staff wrote the British characters better than anyone else he had worked with, despite there not being any British writers on the staff.

Casting

The main cast for the season includes Hayley Atwell as Peggy Carter, reprising her role from the film series, James D'Arcy as Edwin Jarvis, Chad Michael Murray as Jack Thompson, Enver Gjokaj as Daniel Sousa, and Shea Whigham as Roger Dooley.

In March 2014, Markus and McFeely stated that Howard Stark would be a recurring character, contingent on Dominic Cooper's involvement. In June 2014, Atwell confirmed that Cooper would be involved with the series. Kyle Bornheimer, Ralph Brown, Meagen Fay, Lyndsy Fonseca, and Bridget Regan also recur as Ray Krzeminski, Johann Fennhoff, Miriam Fry, Angie Martinelli, and Dottie Underwood, respectively, throughout the series.

In November 2014, it was announced that Costa Ronin would portray a younger version of Anton Vanko, who was portrayed in Iron Man 2 by Yevgeni Lazarev. Chris Evans appears as Steve Rogers / Captain America via archive footage from The First Avenger. Neal McDonough and Toby Jones also reprise their roles of Timothy "Dum Dum" Dugan and Arnim Zola from previous MCU films, One-Shots, and/or television series during the season.

Filming
Filming began in Los Angeles around late September / early October 2014, with the working title Nylon, and was completed on January 20, 2015. Filming locations included Los Angeles City Hall, Griffith Park, Royce Canyon, the marina in San Pedro, and the Port of Los Angeles.

Cinematographer Gabriel Beristain, returning from the One-Shot, used a combination of modern digital technology and traditional analog techniques to replicate the feel of classic films that are set in the 1940s, but to also have the convenience and consistency of modern technology. Beristain uses the Arri Alexa digital camera, along with Leica Lenses and silk-stocking diffusion nets, the latter on which he recalled "I had last used in the 1980s in England on videos and commercials. I remembered that they were fantastic. In combination with the Leica lenses, the look is very classic, very much like a 1940s film. When I saw it, I said, 'This is absolutely Marvel,' and [D'Esposito] agreed." For the series' lighting, Beristain again mixed modern and traditional, using LED fixtures to recreate classic Hollywood lighting. He called his lighting of Atwell "an homage to the great cinematographers who lit Lauren Bacall and Grace Kelly."

Visual effects
Sheena Duggal, who served as visual effects supervisor on the Agent Carter One-Shot, returned to the position for the series, while the companies Industrial Light & Magic (ILM) and Base FX created the visual effects. Work by ILM includes the creation of backdrops for the series, including matte paintings, depicting 1940s New York. DNeg TV also created visual effects, with ILM coordinating with them and Base to maintain a "seamless workflow". The season had 1038 visual effects shots, with multiple episodes being worked on in post-production simultaneously to complete the work. In addition to all the set extensions required to depict the period (the series filmed at "every back lot in LA, including Universal, Paramount and Warner Bros., relying on a tremendous amount of green screen and matte paintings to create the show's authentic-looking locations"), Duggal also noted difficulty in simulating the imploding bombs and creating a fully CG truck that drives off a cliff.

Music
In September 2014, Christopher Lennertz officially signed on to compose for the series, having previously composed the Agent Carter One-Shot. Lennertz combined all the different style elements of the show in the music, such as mixing jazz and period elements, with orchestra and electronic elements. In his research of the music of the time period, Lennertz learned that jazz was shifting from big band to smaller ensembles, and bebop was being introduced. This allowed him to incorporate trumpets in his scores, to harken to the time period and because they are "also very sneaky, and it lends itself to espionage". Lennertz used the alto flute to capture "Carter's aura", saying, "It feels like a strong woman's voice, especially as she's sneaking around....it also has that spy quality." Additionally, Lennertz was able to reorchestrate "Star-Spangled Man" for the season, which is originally by Alan Menken for Captain America: The First Avenger, and introduced a folk choral piece performed by a Russian men's choir during "The Iron Ceiling". A soundtrack album for the season was released on iTunes on December 11, 2015.

All music composed by Christopher Lennertz.

Marvel Cinematic Universe tie-ins
Markus, talking about the series place in the greater architecture of the MCU in January 2015 said "you really only need to drop the tiniest bit of hint and its connected. You don't have to go, "Howard Stark's wearing the same pants that Tony wears!" ... Everything is enhanced just by the knowledge that its all connected." The season introduces the Red Room program, which would eventually produce Natasha Romanoff, who appears in multiple MCU films portrayed by Scarlett Johansson. Although the origins of the program are explored, the term "Black Widow" is never used in the series. Agent Carter also explores the origins of the Hydra-led Winter Soldier program, as seen by the end tag in "Valediction" when Zola approaches Faustus about mind control. The law firm Goodman, Kurtzberg, and Holliway is mentioned, with a modern-day version of the law firm, Goodman, Lieber, Kurtzberg, and Holliway, appearing in the Marvel Studios Disney+ series She-Hulk: Attorney at Law (2022).

Marketing
In the lead up to the airing of the series, Atwell made several appearances as Carter in Agents of S.H.I.E.L.D.s second season. Footage from the first episode was shown at New York Comic Con on October 10, 2014, and again in ABC's one-hour television special, Marvel 75 Years: From Pulp to Pop!, which aired in November 2014. The first teaser for the series debuted during Agents of S.H.I.E.L.D. on October 28, 2014, with the tagline "Sometimes the best man for the job ... is a woman." Though the trailer itself was received positively, the tagline was criticized as "awful" and "ridiculous", and Alan Sepinwall of HitFix said "I get that one of the themes of the show will be Peggy dealing with the sexism of the time, but these ads exist in 2014, not 1945. Please find a new tagline."

Release

Broadcast

Agent Carter debuted in the United States and Canada as a two-hour series premiere on January 6, 2015, on ABC and CTV, respectively. It began airing in New Zealand on TV2 on February 11, 2015. In October 2014, Channel 4, the channel that airs Agents of S.H.I.E.L.D. in the United Kingdom, stated that they did not "have any current plans [to air] Agent Carter". In June 2015, FOX UK purchased the broadcast rights for the United Kingdom, with the series premiering on July 12, 2015.

Home media
The season was released on Blu-ray and DVD on September 18, 2015, as an Amazon.com exclusive. On November 29, 2017, Hulu acquired the exclusive streaming rights to the series, and the season was made available on Disney+ at launch, on November 12, 2019.

Reception

Ratings

The season averaged 7.14 million total viewers, including from DVR, ranking 74th among network series in the 2014–15 television season. It also had an average total 18-49 rating of 2.3, which was 46th.

Critical response
The review aggregator website Rotten Tomatoes reported a 96% approval rating with an average rating of 7.90/10 based on 50 reviews. The website's consensus reads, "Focusing on Peggy Carter as a person first and an action hero second makes Marvel's Agent Carter a winning, stylish drama with bursts of excitement and an undercurrent of cheeky fun". Metacritic, which uses a weighted average, assigned a score of 73 out of 100 based on 27 reviews, indicating "generally favorable reviews."

Brian Lowry, reviewing the two-part premiere for Variety, felt that giving Atwell her own television series was "a pretty smart bet" by Marvel, and he called the episodes "considerable fun". He noted the period setting as contributing to this, and positively mentioned the score by composer Christopher Lennertz. Darren Franich of Entertainment Weekly felt that "the show isn't as retro-stylish as it thinks it is ... the first hour of Agent Carter feels like an above-average episode of Young Indiana Jones Chronicles", noting that it tonally aims for His Girl Friday, Dick Tracy, and Alias ("A tough tonal mixture on a weekly broadcast budget, but also an ambition worth pursuing"), but praised Atwell's performance, calling her "a delight" and "firing on all cylinders". Franich was negative about what he saw to be common MCU tropes, notably "Somebody named Stark invented something dangerous; everyone wants an All-Important Glowing Thing; there's an implicit promise that nothing will be solved for weeks/years to come." Though he was wary about the series being forced to contribute to the rest of the MCU, he did note that "Agent Carter feels pleasantly segmented off from the greater Marvel Machinery".

Eric Goldman of IGN gave the first season an 8.8 out of 10, saying, "Agent Carter didn't need to succeed by setting up something to pay off in Guardians of the Galaxy 2 – it just needed to be an entertaining, involving show. And boy, was it." He also praised the Peggy/Jarvis dynamic, the MCU tie-ins and connections the series included, such as the Black Widow program, and the strong portrayals of the season's supporting characters. Amy Ratcliffe at Nerdist called the season "a memorable splash" a noted that the lack of filler in the short season lead to "action-packed but not overstuffed" episodes. She praised the "period aspect that's defined so well by music, sets, and costumes" as placing the series "head and shoulders above others", and called the cast "eminently talented". On the other hand, Lowry ultimately found the series "just didn't have legs", saying that after the premiere it "meandered through several episodes that merely seemed to inch the story along, rallying only slightly in the not wholly satisfying conclusion." He felt that outside of Atwell's Carter and D'Arcy's Jarvis that characters were not developed enough, and said that the MCU tie-in with Toby Jones' Arnim Zola made the series seem like "a footnote".

Accolades
Maureen Ryan of Variety named the show one of the Top 20 Best New Shows of 2015, while Digital Spy ranked it 10th on their Best TV Shows of 2015 list. The A.V. Club named Atwell's performance as one of the "Best Individual Performances" of 2015.

References

General references

External links

 

2015 American television seasons